Variable refrigerant flow (VRF), also known as variable refrigerant volume (VRV), is an HVAC technology invented by Daikin Industries, Ltd. in 1982. Like ductless minisplits, VRFs use refrigerant as the cooling and heating medium. This refrigerant is conditioned by one or more condensing units (which may be outdoors or indoors, water or air cooled), and is circulated within the building to multiple indoor units. VRF systems, unlike conventional chiller-based systems, allow for varying degrees of cooling in more specific areas (because there are no large air handlers, only smaller indoor units), may supply hot water in a heat recovery configuration without affecting efficiency, and switch to heating mode (heat pump) during winter without additional equipment, all of which may allow for reduced energy consumption. Also, air handlers and large ducts are not used which can reduce the height above a dropped ceiling as well as structural impact as VRF uses smaller penetrations for refrigerant pipes instead of ducts.

Description
VRFs are typically installed with an air conditioner inverter which adds a DC inverter to the compressor in order to support variable motor speed and thus variable refrigerant flow rather than simply perform on/off operation. By operating at varying speeds, VRF units work only at the needed rate allowing for substantial energy savings at load conditions. Heat recovery VRF technology allows individual indoor units to heat or cool as required, while the compressor load benefits from the internal heat recovery. Energy savings of up to 55% are predicted over comparable unitary equipment.
 This also results in greater control of the building's interior temperature by the building's occupants.  The lower start-up power of VRF's DC inverter compressors and their inherent DC power requirements also allow VRF solar-powered heat pumps to be run using DC-providing solar panels.   

VRFs come in two system formats, two pipe and three pipe systems. In a heat pump two pipe system all of the zones must either be all in cooling or all in heating. Heat Recovery (HR) systems have the ability to simultaneously heat certain zones while cooling others; this is usually done through a three pipe design, with the exception of Mitsubishi, Carrier and LG whose systems are able to do this with a two pipe system using a branch circuit (BC) controller to the individual indoor evaporator zones. In this case the heat extracted from zones requiring cooling is put to use in the zones requiring heating. This is made possible because the heating unit is functioning as a condenser, providing sub-cooled liquid back into the line that is being used for cooling. While the heat recovery system has a greater initial cost, it allows for better zoned thermal control of a building and overall greater efficiencies. In heat recovery VRF systems, some of the indoor units may be in cooling mode while others are in heating mode, reducing energy consumption. If the coefficient of performance in cooling mode of a system is 3, and the coefficient of performance in heating mode is 4, then heat recovery performance can reach more than 7. While it is unlikely that this balance of cooling and heating demand will happen often throughout the year, energy efficiency can be greatly improved when the scenario occurs.

VRF systems may be air or water cooled. If air cooled, VRF condensing units are exposed to outside air and may be outdoors, and condensing units are the size of large refrigerators, since they need to contain a large condenser (heat exchanger) which has a large surface area to transfer heat to the surrounding air, because air doesn't have a high heat capacity and has a low density, volumetric thermal capacity and thermal conductivity thus needing to transfer heat into a large amount of air volume at once. If water cooled, the condensing units are placed indoors and are much smaller and cooled with water by a closed type or circuit cooling tower or dry cooler.

Japan
VRF systems have been used in Japan since the 1980s. By 2007, in Japan, VRFs are used in 50% of midsize office buildings (up to 70,000 ft2 or 6,500 m2) and 33% of large commercial buildings (more than 70,000 ft2 or 6,500 m2). Daikin, a Japanese company, is the inventor of variable refrigerant volume systems (or VRV by Daikin air conditioning, other manufacturers remarketed this as VRF as VRV is a trademark).

Home automation integration
There are dedicated gateways that connect VRFs with		home automation and building management systems (BMS) controllers for centralized control and monitoring. In addition, such gateway solutions are capable of providing remote control operation of all HVAC indoor units over the internet incorporating a simple and friendly user interface.

Primary manufacturers

Japan:
 Daikin
 Panasonic
 Mitsubishi Heavy Industries
 Fujitsu (Fujitsu General)
 Hitachi  (Now Johnson Controls-Hitachi (Air Conditioning) (Jci-Hitachi)
 Mitsubishi Electric
 Finpower Aircon LLC
 Toshiba
 Yanmar (gas heat pumps)
 Sharp(former)
 Sanyo(now Panasonic)
 Toshiba Carrier(Former Air-conditioning & Heating International (AHI)(AHI-Carrier/Toshiba) (Toshiba-Carrier) (As of 2018, the joint venture(s) seem to have been broken up, as Carrier now manufactures VRF systems of its own and Toshiba's websites no longer show the Carrier logo in their product images (which is not the case in some of Carrier's images) and web pages, and the AHI-Carrier(Toshiba) website has not been updated since 2016)

Korea:
 LG 
 Samsung

India:
 Blue Star Limited
 Voltas
 SB Cooling Corporation

Italy:
 Innova SRL

United States:
 Ephoca
 Innovair
 Carrier (Made by Toshiba)
 York International(Made by Hitachi)
 Trane (formerly made by Samsung, now made by Mitsubishi Electric)
 Lennox
 Afka Group (American Pro)
 CIAC(Carrier)

France:
 Airwell

China/Other:
 Acson
 Gree
 Tosot
 Haier
 Hisense
 Inventor
 Midea
 Bright
 Dekon
 ALKKT
 Chigo
 Ecox
Bosch (made by Midea)

References 

Heating, ventilation, and air conditioning